Timescape Zero is an American metalcore band from Miami formed in 1991. They are seen as one of the lesser known bands which helped start the metalcore scene. The band formed after the break-up of Hangman (who released only one song on a 7-inch compilation on Youthbus Records), when they replaced the original lead singer with Adel Souto of Feast of Hate and Fear fanzine. Lyrical themes include social issues, religion, politics, mental illness, individualism and self-awareness. Their influences include late 80s straight edge hardcore, Sheer Terror, Killing Time, Sick of It All, Charles Manson and Anton LaVey.

They broke up in 1998 but played reunion shows in 2004 and again in 2010.

Discography
Welcome to the Kaliyuga - Demo cassette - 1991
Life in Sodom - Demo cassette - 1992
split 7-inch with Subliminal Criminal on Feast of Hate and Fear - 1993
Born with the Fear of Dreaming - 12-inch LP on Hefty Records / cassette on Feast of Hate and Fear - 1994
Total War - CD on X-Ray Records - 1997 / re-released on Feast of Hate and Fear - 2001
Everything Short of Total War (early years discography) - CD - 2004

External links

Metalcore musical groups from Florida